Karl Giesser (29 October 1928 – 15 January 2010) was an Austrian football midfielder who played for Austria in the 1954 FIFA World Cup. He also played for SK Rapid Wien.

References

1928 births
2010 deaths
Austrian footballers
Austria international footballers
Association football midfielders
SK Rapid Wien players
1954 FIFA World Cup players